Asplundia is a genus of plants belonging to the family Cyclanthaceae. They are distributed in the Neotropical realm from southern Mexico to southern Brazil.

 Species

References

 
Pandanales genera